Vitii is an ancient tribe that lived on the territory of Caucasian Albania. Some scholars believe that the Vitii were Caucasian Albanians, while others consider them to have migrated to the Caucasus by the ancient Greeks. Some consider the Vitii to be the ancestors of the modern Udins, but according to other statements, these two tribes could live at the same time. V.V. Nikolaev identifies the Vitii with Gutians.  A.A. Tuallagov describes the Vitii as Caucasian Tocharians and says that they came from the territory of the Yuezhi tribe.

According to Strabo, on their lands there was a city in Albania, where the Thessalians from the Ainian tribe lived; according to another version, “Ainians” is a distortion of the local name “Utii” or “Vitii”. In Armenian sources, their land was called "Otena".                 In addition, Strabo mentions one more tribe of Vitii who lived north of the tribes of Albanians and Caspians on the shores of the Caspian Sea. According to Pliny, the Vitii and Albanians made up the majority in the territory of ancient Sakasene, which was located in the area of present-day Nagorno-Karabakh. Igor M. Diakonoff claims that some of the Uti were part of the Scythian kingdom in the Transcaucasia.

References 

Caucasian Albania
Ancient peoples